Phosphoramides are a class of phosphorus compounds with the formula O=P(NR2)3-n(OH)n. They can be considered derivatives of phosphoric acid where OH groups have been replaced with an amino or R-substituted amino group. In practise the term is commonly confined to the phosphoric triamides (P(=O)(NR2)3), essentially phosphoramide and derivatives thereof. Derivatives with the general structures P(=O)(OH)(NR2)2 or P(=O)(OH)2(NR2) are usually referred to as phosphoramidic acids.

Examples
Phenyl phosphorodiamidate, a phosphoramide but also a phosphate ester, is used in agriculture to enhance the effectiveness of urea-based fertilizers.
Hexamethylphosphoramide (HMPA) is a polar solvent.

References

 
Functional groups